Elachista multipunctata is a moth of the family Elachistidae. It is found in Tajikistan.

The length of the forewings is about 3.4 mm. The ground colour of the forewings is white, strongly mottled with brown tipped scales. The hindwings are white. Adults have been recorded in August.

References

multipunctata
Moths described in 1990
Moths of Asia